Maramandougou is a rural commune in the Cercle of Kangaba in the Koulikoro Region of south-western Mali. The principal village lies at Figuira-Toma.

References

External links
.

Communes of Koulikoro Region